Zhang Zhehan (born 11 May 1991) is a Chinese actor and singer. His first major role was as Wei Ying in the Chinese historical drama Legend of Ban Shu (2015). He is best known for his roles in Legend of Yunxi (2018), The Blooms at Ruyi Pavilion (2020) and Word of Honor (2021).

In 2020, he received the Weibo Award for Rising Artist of the Year. He won the Weibo Movie Night award for Most Watched/Followed Actor of the Year in June 2021.

In 2021, Zhang faced severe criticism in China after being involved in a controversy over photos taken years earlier in Japan at a spot near the Yasukuni Shrine and Nogi Shrine due to the shrines' honoring of imperial Japanese military officers who invaded China. This criticism resulted in the removal of his online social media accounts, movies, television shows and music.

Early life
Zhang Zhehan was born in Xinyu, Jiangxi province, China on May 11, 1991. He graduated from the Shanghai Theatre Academy.

Career

2010–2021: Early years and breakthrough success
In 2010, Zhang made his acting debut in the romantic drama Why Love You. Thereafter, he signed a contract with Yu Zheng's studio, and played the leading role in the comedy web series Crazy for Palace and its sequel. The series gained a small following online.

Zhang then went on to act in various supporting roles in dramas produced by Yu Zheng; such as Palace 3: The Lost Daughter, The Romance of the Condor Heroes and Love Yunge from the Desert. He first gained recognition playing the role of the antagonist in the mystery costume drama Cosmetology High, and went on to portray young Mei Changsu in the acclaimed historical drama Nirvana in Fire.

In 2015, Zhang played the male lead in historical drama Legend of Ban Shu with Jing Tian. He went on to play lead roles in the spy drama Decoded, and headlined both seasons of the fantasy web series Demon Girl. In 2018, Zhang played in the historical romance drama Legend of Yunxi alongside Ju Jingyi. The series received much praise for its storyline. In 2019, Zhang performed in the disaster film The Bravest as a firefighter.
He starred as Wang Yue in the short film Brother, which was directed by Vicky Zhao. He has also appeared as a regular member in the variety show Everybody Standby.   

In 2020, Zhang starred in the romantic drama  Everyone Wants to Meet You produced by Zhao Wei. Zhang also appeared in the historical romance drama The Blooms at Ruyi Pavilion alongside Ju Jingyi.

In 2021, Zhang starred alongside Gong Jun in the Wuxia drama series Word of Honor, which is an adaptation of the BL novel Tian Ya Ke by Priest. He played the role of Zhou Zishu, an elite royal service leader who leaves his past and starts anew. He then met Wen Kexing, a mysterious martial arts master. Both embark on a journey together and find soulmates in each other.  Word of Honor gained popularity in and outside of China, especially after the show aired on Netflix. The show's first episode has accumulated over 8.7 million views on Youtube, and its popularity put the two male leads Gong Jun and Zhang under the spotlight, becoming overnight sensations.

2021: Domestic boycott 

On August 13, 2021, photos surfaced online of Zhang posing in front of cherry blossom trees near Japan's Yasukuni Shrine in 2018 and of him attending a wedding ceremony at Nogi Shrine in 2019. The shrines are controversial in China due to their honoring of imperial Japanese military officers who invaded China. At the wedding, Zhang also took a photo with Dewi Sukarrno, who was incorrectly labeled by Weibo users as "a right-wing anti-Chinese politician". The photos sparked outrage among Chinese netizens. Zhang issued an apology, stating: "Today, I deeply apologize for my past ignorance, my shame and especially my previous improper behaviour. I attended a friend’s wedding in Japan. It is my mistake for the oversight of [not knowing] the historical background behind the wedding venue and the political background of the other wedding guests.  When I used to travel everywhere, I liked to casually take pictures. Due to the lack of understanding for the local architecture and the history and being careless about the content when taking pictures, when I took the pictures, it resulted in content that seriously harmed the feelings of compatriots. I also solemnly apologize here, I am sorry." In response, the People's Daily stated: "As a public figure, a lack of historical knowledge and unknowingness of the suffering of the nation is unacceptable." 

The China Association of Performing Arts (CAPA), a voluntary association made up of management companies and members of the entertainment industry, called for a boycott on Zhang due to the controversial photos. Numerous brand endorsements terminated their association with Zhang. His upcoming films and television shows also ended their associations with him; Tencent Video, Youku, iQIYI and Mango TV took down his works from their streaming platforms in China voluntarily and Zhang's scenes in the movie 1921 were replaced by another actor. Sina Weibo shut down his Super Topic, and his personal and studio accounts were removed from Douyin, Douban and other Chinese sites. QQ Music and NetEase Music removed Zhang's songs from their music platforms.

Li Xuezheng, the Vice Chairman of the China TV Artists Association and Director of the Golden Shield Television Center questioned the authority of the China Association of Performing Arts (CAPA) to issue a blacklist of artists, which had included Zhang. Li says Zhang was not blacklisted by the National Radio and Television Administration (NRTA) or the Ministry of Culture and Tourism, who, Li argues, are the only authorities able to blacklist people in the industry. According to Chinese regulations, issuing a "boycott announcement" is not within the scope of CAPA's business. He questioned who compiled the list, what criteria was used, and whether CAPA has the legal power to impose sanctions against Chinese online influencers and performers. Li said he was prepared to help Zhang file a lawsuit against CAPA since he believes Zhang did not violate any laws in order for him to be censored. Later on 1 January 2022, Li released a 10-minute interview with Zhang on his Weibo page, which was the first time Zhang appeared on a public platform since August 2021. During the interview, Zhang said that he did not enter or visit the Yasukuni Shrine and expressed a willingness to be investigated. He also stated: "Both my mother and I fell into a state of panic. I didn't dare to go out and even started to doubt myself. I've been very patriotic but suddenly, after the incident, people are calling me a traitor. They even called my mum the mistress of a Japanese and insulted my dad, who actually passed away in 2016. I've been living in fear and don't dare to go out". The allegations that Zhang had visited Japan's Yasukuni Shrine and taken photographs with an anti-Chinese politician are likely fabricated. In December 2021, Zhang filed a police report over online defamation.

2022–present: Return to public life, music releases
In April 2022, Zhang returned to social media and posted a handwritten letter on his Instagram account thanking his supporters and requested that those reading his letter not hurt his family and friends. He also wrote that he and another star of Word of Honor had not had any contact since June 2021. In a follow-up video, he claimed that this ex-colleague had been using elements related to Zhang in their own endorsements without permission. This video and follow up posts caused a number of online fans to report his account as a deep fake due to their ongoing belief that the two actors were secretly in a same-sex romantic relationship despite his clarification. While Zhang did not directly indicate which co-star by name, newspapers reported his posts implicated his co-star Gong Jun's marketing team as the ones capitalizing on the fandom shipping of the two while Zhang was cancelled. In the same video, Zhang stated outside sources were "spending lots of money to create rumors about the political standing of a patriotic citizen, editing Baidu pages, working with social influencers, and using large amounts of Internet Water Army to influence the media."

In December 2022, Zhang returned from a year of domestic boycott with two singles "Melancholy Sunshine" and "Knight Errant", both reaching #1 on the global iTunes music charts. The lyricist and composer for "Melancholy Sunshine" was Malaysian songwriter Keon Chia, and Zhang Zhehan helped compose the lyrics for "Knight Errant". Both of the singles are part of the album Deep Blue. On January 14, 2023, the third single "Journey", in the Deep Blue series was released on various platforms. Zhang wrote and composed this song. The song played on Taiwanese radio HIT FM and Canadian Fairchild radio from December 28th to December 30th, 2022.  On January 26, 2023, the fourth single "Primordial Theater", in the Deep Blue series was released on various platforms. Zhang wrote the lyrics for this song. The fifth single, "Lost Glacier," of the Deep Blue series was released on February 14, 2023.  The song was earlier launched on Taiwanese radio HIT FM and Canadian Fairchild radio from February 8th to February 10th, 2023.  The sixth single, Magnificent Life, of the Deep Blue series, premiered on YouTube on March 17, 2023. It was released on various platforms at midnight on March 18, 2023.

Filmography

Films

Television Series

Variety Shows

Discography

Album

Singles

Stage Performances

Concerts

Awards and nominations

References

External links
 
 

Living people
1991 births
Male actors from Jiangxi
Chinese male television actors
Shanghai Theatre Academy alumni
21st-century Chinese male actors
Chinese male film actors
The Amazing Race contestants
People from Xinyu